Clausilioides is a genus of air-breathing land snails, terrestrial pulmonate gastropod mollusks in the family Enidae. This species in this genus are obligate rock-dwellers that inhabit a limited area in northeastern Turkey.

Species
Species within the genus Clausilioides include:
 Clausilioides biplicatus (Retowski, 1889)
 Clausilioides filifer (Lindholm, 1913)

References

Enidae
Gastropod genera
Taxa named by Wassili Adolfovitch Lindholm